Eustomias schmidti, more commonly known as the scaleless dragonfish, is one of the many species included in the family of Stomiidae. Despite its small size, the scaleless dragonfish is a dangerous predator in the deep oceanic waters that uses its self-generated light to attract its prey.

Physical characteristics

Body
Eustomias schmidti has an elongated and slender body. The head is quite small with large jaws that are about the same length as the head. The jawbone has small, erect teeth standing in an anterior direction.
Each Eustomias schmidti has 22–28 dorsal fins and 36–43 anal soft rays. This type of fish has no dorsal or anal spines. One of the defining characteristics of the genus Eustomias is the barbel. On the barbel of the Eustomias schmidti, it has three branches arising from the stem. The middle branch is stout and swollen with distal filaments that barely reach the barbel tip. The side branches taper and extend far beyond the end of the barbel, with an exception in smaller specimens. The terminal bulb is strongly constricted. One or more complex filaments rise from the region of constriction of the bulb.

Along the body, there are two prominent ventrolateral rows of photophores. In addition, there are many small photophores covering most of the body and head. The scaleless dragonfish has two pectoral finrays (bounded closely in a black membrane) and seven pelvic finrays.

At its first maturity level, the females reach  whereas the males are slightly smaller and reach . Overall, a scaleless dragonfish can reach to be  during its lifetime.

Skin and color
It has no scales or hexagonal areas on its body. The scaleless fish's skin is usually black, sometimes iridescent silver, bronze, or green.

Habitat
The Eustomias schmidti are mostly mesopelagic. Therefore, they are most commonly found in deep oceanic waters. During the night, some fish choose to migrate to near-surface waters.

Diet
Their diet consists mainly of other mesopelagic fishes as well as some crustaceans.

Distribution
The scaleless dragonfish occur in the Atlantic and Pacific oceans between 35–40° N and 30–35° S but are found mostly in boundary currents or equatorial water. Other areas include the Gulf of Mexico, Caribbean Sea, and the Indian Ocean.

Countries where Eustomias schmidti is found:
Australia
Canary Islands
Hawaii
Japan
Madeira Islands
Morocco
Namibia
New Zealand
Papua New Guinea
South Africa
West Sahara

Ecosystems where Eustomias schmidti occurs:
Bear Seamount
Atlantic Ocean
Benguela Current
Canary Current
Caribbean Sea
East Central Australian Shelf
Gulf of Mexico
Indian Ocean
Kuroshio Current
New Zealand Shelf
Pacific Ocean
Southeast U.S. Continental Shelf
Tasman Sea

References

Stomiidae
Taxa named by Charles Tate Regan
Taxa named by Ethelwynn Trewavas
Fish described in 1930